The Midlothian Community Hospital is a community hospital in Eskbank Road, Bonnyrigg, Scotland. It is managed by NHS Lothian.


History
Plans for the hospital were announced in 2005, with the facility intended to replace the continuing care elements of Loanhead Hospital and Rosslynlee Hospital. It was built by Robertson Group and opened in September 2010.

Services
The hospital has 88 staffed beds spread across 4 wards. Some 40 beds are allocated to care of the elderly and 48 for elderly people with mental health issues.

References

Hospital buildings completed in 2010
Buildings and structures in Midlothian
Hospitals established in 2010
Hospitals in Midlothian
NHS Lothian
NHS Scotland hospitals
Bonnyrigg and Lasswade